László Budavári (3 August 1953) is a former Hungarian professional footballer who played as forward and left winger. He was a member of the Hungarian national football team.

Career 
He started his football career at Budapest Honvéd FC. In the summer of 1974, he was transferred to VM Egyetértés. After that he played for Bp. Spartacus and Szolnoki MÁV FC. From 1977 to 1981 he played football for Békéscsaba. From there he transferred to Csepel SC, where he finished fourth with the team in the 1982–83 season. Between 1981 and 1986 he played 86 league games for Csepel FC and scored 13 goals.

National team 
In 1982 he made one appearance for the national team and scored one goal.

Honours 

 Nemzeti Bajnokság I (NB I)
 Fourth: 1982-83

References 

1953 births
Living people
Hungarian footballers
Hungary international footballers
Footballers from Budapest
Association football forwards
Budapest Honvéd FC players
MTK Budapest FC players
Szolnoki MÁV FC footballers
Csepel SC footballers
Nemzeti Bajnokság I players
Nemzeti Bajnokság II players